Helmut V. Koch (born 5 October 1932) is a German mathematician specializing in number theory.

Education and career
Koch was born in Potsdam. Koch studied from 1952 to 1957 at the Humboldt-Universität zu Berlin. From 1957 to 1959 he worked in the semiconductor plant at Teltow. From 1959 he was a member of the Institute for Mathematics of the Akademie der Wissenschaften der DDR, where he received in 1964 his promotion (Ph.D.) and in 1965 his habilitation. He studied under Hans Reichardt and Igor Shafarevich (1960/61 in Moscow). The famous "Number Theory" textbook by Shafarevich and Borevich was translated by Koch from Russian into German. Koch was from 1969 to 1991 the head of the research group at the Institute for Mathematics and from 1992 to 1996 the head of a working group at the Humboldt University, where he became a full professor in 1992. He was on research sabbaticals in Moscow, Saint Petersburg, and Novosibirsk and at the University of Paris, University of Montreal, University of Alberta, University of Cambridge, ETH Zürich, the Stefan Banach International Mathematical Center in Warsaw, and the Max-Planck-Institut für Mathematik in Bonn.

Koch's research deals with, among other topics, the Galois theory of algebraic number fields, p-extensions of number fields, cubic number fields, and class field theory.

He was a member of the Akademie der Wissenschaften der DDR. He is a full member of the Academy of Sciences Leopoldina, the Academia Europaea, and the Berlin-Brandenburgische Akademie der Wissenschaften. He is a corresponding member of the Heidelberger Akademie der Wissenschaften. In 1986 he was an Invited Speaker at the ICM in 1986 in Berkeley, California. In 1993 he became a member of the editorial staff of the  Mathematische Nachrichten.

Selected publications
 with Herbert Pieper: Zahlentheorie – ausgewählte Methoden und Ergebnisse. Deutscher Verlag der Wissenschaften, Berlin 1976 (Einführung)
 Zahlentheorie – algebraische Zahlen und Funktionen. Vieweg 1997
 Algebraic Number Theory. 2nd edition, Springer 1997 (in Encyclopedia of mathematical sciences, eds. Parshin, Shafarevich)
 Einführung in die Mathematik – Hintergründe der Schulmathematik. Springer, 2nd edition 2004, 
 Einführung in die klassische Mathematik, vol. 1 Vom quadratischen Reziprozitätsgesetz zum Uniformisierungssatz. Springer 1986, English: Introduction to classical mathematics – from the quadratic reciprocity law to the uniformization theorem, Kluwer 1991
 Galois theory of p-extensions. Springer 2002 (older edition: Die Galoissche Theorie der p-Erweiterungen, Deutscher Verlag der Wissenschaften 1970)
 Über Galoissche Gruppen von p-adischen Zahlkörpern, Akademie Verlag 1964

Sources
 Gottwald, Ilgauds, Schlote: Biographien bedeutender Mathematiker, Leipzig 1990

References

External links
 

Members of Academia Europaea
Members of the German Academy of Sciences Leopoldina
20th-century German mathematicians
21st-century German mathematicians
Humboldt University of Berlin alumni
1932 births
Living people
Members of the German Academy of Sciences at Berlin